Royal Centre, also known as RBC Tower or Royal Bank Tower, is a skyscraper complex located at 1055 West Georgia Street in Downtown Vancouver's Financial District. The skyscraper stands at just under 145m tall and 37 storeys. Royal Centre was the tallest building in Vancouver upon completion in 1973 and remained so until it was overtaken by Harbour Centre in 1977.

The primary tenant of the complex is RBC's British Columbia headquarters. The building is owned and managed by Brookfield Properties, a major North American commercial real estate company.

Services

There are two underground levels of retail stores in the Royal Centre complex.

The complex has direct access to the Burrard SkyTrain station.

See also
List of tallest buildings in Vancouver
Royal Bank Tower (Vancouver)

References

External links
Royal Centre website
Emporis.com

Skyscrapers in Vancouver
Shopping malls in Metro Vancouver
Office buildings completed in 1973
Bank buildings in Canada
Brookfield Properties buildings
Skyscraper office buildings in Canada
Royal Bank of Canada